The Coup of 1809 also referred to as the Revolution of 1809 (Swedish: Revolutionen 1809) was a Swedish coup d'état by a group of noblemen led by Georg Adlersparre. The coup resulted in the deposition of King Gustav IV Adolf of Sweden and the introduction of the Instrument of Government (1809). The coup was provoked by the disastrous Finnish War. The leaders of the coup are known in history collectively as 1809 års män ('Men of 1809').

See also
 Gustavian Party
 Ulrica Eleonora Rålamb
 Armfelt Conspiracy

References

Further reading 
 Isakson, Börje (2009). Två dygn som förändrade Sverige : 1809 års revolution. Stockholm: Natur & Kultur. Libris 10701773. 
 Isaksson, Anders (2009). Kärlek och krig : revolutionen 1809. Stockholm: Bonnier. Libris 11204680. 
 Jacobson, Magnus (2005). ”Kuppen mot kungen”. Populär historia "2005:10,": sid. 22-23 : färgill.. 1102–0822. . Libris 10277020
 O'Regan, Christopher (2009). I stormens öga : Gustaf IV Adolfs regeringstid och revolten 1809. Stockholm: Forum. Libris 11204747. 

1800s coups d'état and coup attempts
19th century in Sweden
Conflicts in 1809
1809 in Sweden
19th century in Stockholm